The Hardest Part is the second album by singer/songwriter Allison Moorer. The album is a concept album about a doomed relationship produced and co-written by Moorer's then husband Doyle Lee Primm. The album is based on her parents' relationship which ended in the mid-1980s when Moorer's father murdered her mother before killing himself. She told No Depression magazine in 2000: "This record was inspired by the things I saw my mother go through. It’s not the true story, but it’s inspired by the true story."

Track listing

Personnel
 Jay Bennett - acoustic guitar, mellotron, piano
 Richard Bennett - acoustic guitar
 Chris Carmichael - fiddle
 Chad Cromwell - drums
 Eric Darken - percussion
 Kenny Greenberg - 12-string acoustic guitar, acoustic guitar, electric guitar
 Jim Hoke - harmonica
 Allison Moorer - acoustic guitar, lead vocals
 Louis Dean Nunley - background vocals
 Russ Pahl - pedal steel guitar
 Rick Plant - banjo, acoustic guitar, electric guitar
 Michael Rhodes - bass guitar, upright bass
 Rick Schell - background vocals
 Joe Spivey - fiddle
 Harry Stinson - background vocals
 Marty Stuart - mandolin
 Kris Wilkinson - string arrangements, conductor

Chart performance

References

2000 albums
MCA Records albums
Concept albums
Allison Moorer albums
Albums produced by Kenny Greenberg